Kevin Emiliano Dawson Blanco (born 8 February 1992) is a Uruguayan professional footballer who plays as goalkeeper for Colombian club Deportivo Cali.

Career statistics

Honours
Peñarol
Uruguayan Primera División: 2017, 2018, 2021
Supercopa Uruguaya: 2018, 2022

Individual
Uruguayan Primera División Player of the Year: 2018
Uruguayan Primera División Team of the Year: 2018

References

External links
 

1992 births
Living people
People from Colonia del Sacramento
Association football goalkeepers
Uruguayan footballers
Uruguayan people of British descent
Uruguayan Primera División players
Uruguayan Segunda División players
Categoría Primera A players
Club Plaza Colonia de Deportes players
Peñarol players
Deportivo Cali footballers
Uruguayan expatriate footballers
Uruguayan expatriate sportspeople in Colombia
Expatriate footballers in Colombia